{{Infobox animanga/Print
| type            = manga
| title           = The Lady of Pharis
| author          = Ryo Mizuno
| illustrator     = Akihiro Yamada
| publisher       = Kadokawa Shoten
| publisher_en    = 
| demographic     = Shōnen
| magazine        = Marukatsu PC Engine (1991-1993) The Sneaker (1999-2001)'
| imprint         = Dragon Comics (first edition, first volume only)Newtype 100% Comics (second edition)
| first           = April 30, 1991
| last            = April 28, 2001
| volumes         = 2
| volume_list     = 
}}

 is a franchise of fantasy novels by Ryo Mizuno based on the work he originally created for a world called Forcelia as a rules-free setting for role-playing games (RPGs). There have since been multiple manga, anime and computer game adaptations, several of which have been translated into English. The plots generally follow the conventions and structure of the RPG systems including Dungeons & Dragons and Sword World RPG, in which several characters of distinct types undertake a specific quest.

OriginsRecord of Lodoss War was created in 1986 by Group SNE as a Dungeons & Dragons "replay" serialized in the Japanese magazine Comptiq from September 1986 to July 1988 issues, though they also used the setting with other systems such as Tunnels & Trolls and RuneQuest. Replays are not novels, but transcripts of RPG sessions, meant to both hold the interest of readers and convey the events that took place. They have proven to be popular, even to those who do not play role-playing games but are fans of fiction (including fantasy fiction). Similar to light novels, many characters and parties in replays have become popular as characters of anime. An example of such a character is the female elf Deedlit in Record of Lodoss War, who was played by science fiction novelist Hiroshi Yamamoto during the RPG sessions.

The popularity of the Record of Lodoss War replays was such that the Dungeon Master Ryo Mizuno started to adapt the story into some of the earliest Japanese-language domestic high fantasy novels in 1988.

When the replay series went on to become a trilogy, Group SNE had to abandon the Dungeons & Dragons rules and create their own game, dubbed Record of Lodoss War Companion and released in 1989. All three parts of the replay series were eventually published as paperbacks by Kadokawa Shoten from 1989 to 1991:

  (November 1989) — Parn's party, retake played according to the Record of Lodoss War Companion rules and incorporating elements from the novelization
  (September 1990) — Orson's party, retake played according to the Record of Lodoss War Companion rules and incorporating elements from the novelization
  (July 1991) — Spark's party, played according to the Record of Lodoss War Companion rules

Three prequel Legend of Lodoss replay volumes based on a draft by Ryo Mizuno, written by Hiroshi Takayama and Group SNE, with illustrations by Retsu Tateo and Tatsumi Minegishi were published. Before being published as light novels, the RPG replays were serialized in Comptiq under the title  .

  (November 1994)
  (October 1995)
  (October 1996)

Two other replay volumes have been published later:
  (April 1998) 
  (October 2020)

Mizuno's novelizations were published by Kadokawa Shoten between 1988 and 1993, and followed by two collections of short stories in 1995, High Elf Forest: Deedlit's Tale and The Black Knight, all with illustrations done by Yutaka Izubuchi. The Black Knight was re-released in 1998, with illustrations by Masato Natsumoto. The first volume of the novelizations, The Grey Witch, was published in English by Seven Seas Entertainment in 2018.

  (April 1988 (Kadokawa Bunko) / August 1994 (Kadokawa Sneaker Bunko))
  (February 1989)
  (January 1990)
  (June 1990)
  (February 1991)
  (November 1991)
  (March 1993)
  (February 1995)
  (July 1995 / September 1998)

The first volume forms the basis for the first eight episodes of the Record of Lodoss War OVA series, as well as both Record of Lodoss War: The Grey Witch  manga series (by Yoshihiko Ochi and Tomomasa Takuma, respectively). The second was also adapted in manga form by Ayumi Saito, and as a four-CD audio drama. The final five episodes of the OVA series are loosely based on the story told across the third and fourth novels and, having caught up with the ongoing novelization at that point, feature an original ending. The Record of Lodoss War: Chronicles of the Heroic Knight TV series and manga drawn by Masato Natsumoto are more faithful adaptations of volumes three to seven. The first collection of short stories was adapted into the Record of Lodoss War: Deedlit's Tale manga series by Setsuko Yoneyama.

In 2019, he began writing a novel sequel series . The new series takes place 100 years after the events of the original series, with Deedlit as the lead protagonist. It is illustrated by Hidari and was adapted into a manga by Atsushi Suzumi.

Legend of Lodoss

  (August 1994)
  (July 1996)
  (November 1996) (Two short stories, later included in Eternal Returner)
  (April 1997)
  (March 1998)
  (December 1999) (Four short stories)
  (October 2002)

 Record of Lodoss War Next Generation
  (May 1998) (Later included in Inheritors of the Flame)
  (August 1998 / July 2001)
  (May 1999 / June 2002)
  (March 2001)
  (November 2001)
  (October 2004)
  (October 2005)
  (November 2006)

PlotRecord of Lodoss War recounts the adventures of a youth by the name of Parn, the son of a dishonored knight. Part of his motivation for adventuring is to find out what happened to his father, and to restore his family's honor. Despite his inexperience, Parn is considered the leader, who is accompanied by his childhood best friend Etoh, his friend and sometimes advisor Slayn (and later by Slayn's lover Leylia), and his newfound mentor Ghim. They are accompanied by Parn's romantic interest, the high elf Deedlit, who comes from the Forest of No Return seeking an answer to her people's isolationism and an end to what she sees as a slow march to extinction; and a thief named Woodchuck. Throughout the series, Parn comes into contact with friends and foes alike. His allies include King Kashue, King Fahn, Shiris, and Orson; his enemies include Emperor Beld, Ashram, and the evil necromancer Wagnard.

The volumes three to seven, adapted into manga and anime Chronicles of the Heroic Knight, continue the adventures of Parn for the first eight episodes, but then focus on Spark and his adventures to complete a quest tasked onto him to protect Neese, the daughter of Slayn and Leylia. He is accompanied by his own cast of friends in the form of Leaf, Garrack, Greevus, Aldo, and Ryna. The television series shares similarities with the plot of the OVA, such as Wagnard seeking to kidnap Neese in order to use her as a reagent for the resurrection of Naneel, a priestess and the Avatar of Kardis who was slain by Leylia's mother, the high priestess Neese a short time after the battle with the demonic god. Leylia was the reincarnation of Naneel, but when she lost her virginity she was no longer capable of being the doorway or reagent needed to unseal Naneel.

The Legend of Crystania setting places the former villain Ashram into the seat of a would-be hero who is placed under a spell by an "animal god" of Crystania. One of the prominent characters is Pirotess, his dark elven lover, as she tries to find a way to free him from the clutches of the spell and to restore him back to his living self.

Other media

Home video releases
The original OVA series and the TV series had both been released in North America through Central Park Media on VHS and on DVD. The OVA and TV series were slated for a Blu-ray release through Media Blasters, but they had dropped all plans to re-release the series. On April 14, 2017, Funimation announced their license to both the OVA series and the Chronicles of the Heroic Knight TV series and released the OVA on both Blu-ray and DVD and the TV series on DVD in one set on July 18, 2017.

Record of Lodoss War Online
GameOn released an online game for PC, Record of Lodoss War Online in April 2017 and closed it on October 31, 2019. Ryo Mizuno, the novelist and co-creator of the franchise, served as a supervisor on the development of the game. The game was also released outside Japan.

Anime

 1990  13 episode OVA produced by Madhouse
 1998  27 episode TV series produced by AIC
 1998  3-part parodic movie produced by AIC
 2014  13 episode parodic TV series produced by Studio Deen and Studio Hibari

Manga
  2 volumes, art by Akihiro Yamada, released in English by CPM Manga
  2 volumes, art by Ayumi Saito
  3 volumes, art by Yoshihiko Ochi, released in English by CPM Manga
  3 volumes, art by Akira Himekawa
  3 volumes, four panel parodic manga, art by Hyakuyashiki Rei, first two volumes released in English by CPM Manga
  6 volumes, art by Masato Natsumoto, released in English by CPM Manga
  2 volumes, art by Setsuko Yoneyama, released in English by CPM Manga
  3 volumes, art by Tomomasa Takuma
  3 volumes, art by Atsushi Suzumi

Related media{{nihongo|Legend of Crystania|はじまりの冒険者たち レジェンド・オブ・クリスタニア|Hajimari no Bōkensha-tachi: Legend of Crystania}}, a series of RPGs and novels adapted to film, OVAs and manga that focus on Crystania, the land to which Ashram and Pirotess migrated after the Lodoss series.Rune Soldier, a more comedic series from the same creator that is set in the same world as Record of Lodoss War, but on the Alecrast continent.

Role-playing games
 1989 
 1991 
 1994 
 1995 
 1996 
 1998  - supplemental material for Sword World RPG 2018  - 30th anniversary revised edition
 2019 

Soundtracks and musicRecord of Lodoss War: Original Soundtrack 1 (VICL-00051 and SLP-85)Record of Lodoss War: Original Soundtrack 2 (VICL-00114)Record of Lodoss War: Original Soundtrack 3 (VICL-00267)Record of Lodoss War: Minstrels' Memory of Lodoss (VICL-8090)Record of Lodoss War: Arrange Sound (VDR-28071)Symphonic House from Record of Lodoss War II Arrange Sound (VICL-8060)Record of Lodoss War TV: Maaya Sakamoto - Kiseki No Umi single (VIDL-30202)Record of Lodoss War TV: Original Soundtrack 1 (VICL-60243)Record of Lodoss War TV: Original Soundtrack 2 (VICL-60244)Record of Lodoss War TV: Original Soundtrack 3 (VICL-60246)Welcome to Lodoss Island! (KICA-400)

Video games
 Record of Lodoss War (PC 98, MSX) 1988
 Record of Lodoss War - Fuku Zinduke (X68000) 1991
 Record of Lodoss War - Haiiro No Majio (X68000/PC Engine) 1991/1992
 Record of Lodoss War 2 - Goshiki No Maryu (X68000/PC Engine) 1992/1994
 Record of Lodoss War (Sega Mega-CD) 1994
 Record of Lodoss War (SNES) 1995
 Record of Lodoss War: Eiyuu Kishiden (Game Boy Color) 1998, published by Tomy
 Record of Lodoss War: Advent of Cardice (Dreamcast) 2000, released in English
 Record of Lodoss War: Successor of the Legend (browser-based TCG) 2012
 Record of Lodoss War Online (PC MMORPG) 2016, released in English
 Record of Lodoss War: Deedlit in Wonder Labyrinth (PC & Consoles, 2D Metroidvania) 2021, released in English

Radio drama
 , released in 4 CD collections. Based on the plot of the second novel which was once supposed to become a second OVA series, but that project was put on hold.

Books on tape
The first three are original stories.
 , side story of novel 1
 , side story of novel 3
 , side story of novel 3, and an episode featuring the mage and magic beast tamer Elena of Alania
 , based on Deedlit's Tale , based on Deedlit's Tale , based on Deedlit's TaleReception
The novel series has sold over 10 million copies in Japan.

Australian magazine Hyper reviewed Chronicles of the Heroic Knight'' in 1999. They rated it 8.5 out of 10.

References

Further reading

External links
 Official Kadokawa novel site 
 Roodosu tou Senki - Akinori Nagaoka, 1990 
 'Lodoss war Online game site' 
 

 
1990 anime OVAs
1998 anime television series debuts
Anime International Company
Central Park Media
CPM Press
FM Towns games
Funimation
Game Boy games
Game Boy Color games
Japanese fantasy novels
Kadokawa Shoten manga
Kadokawa Sneaker Bunko
Kadokawa Dwango franchises
Madhouse (company)
MSX games
NEC PC-9801 games
Sega CD games
Seven Seas Entertainment titles
X68000 games
Super Nintendo Entertainment System games
Sword and sorcery anime and manga
Tomy games
TurboGrafx-CD games
TV Tokyo original programming
War in anime and manga
Yonkoma